"All Me" is a song by American singer Kehlani featuring American singer Keyshia Cole, released on December 23, 2019 through Atlantic Records.

Charts

Certifications

References

2019 singles
2019 songs
Kehlani songs
Keyshia Cole songs
Atlantic Records singles
Songs written by Kehlani
Songs written by Keyshia Cole